The 1921 Tennessee Docs football team (variously "Docs", "UT Doctors" or the "Tennessee Medicos") represented the University of Tennessee College of Medicine in Memphis in the 1921 college football season. The team outscored its opponents 174 to 12.

Schedule

References

Tennessee Docs
Tennessee Docs football seasons
College football undefeated seasons
Tennessee Docs football